Stizocera floridana is a species of beetle in the family Cerambycidae. It was described by Linsley in 1949. It can grow to 13 mm. It is found in Lee County Florida.

References

Stizocera
Beetles described in 1949